Clare Beghtol (15 February 1942 – 3 March 2018) was an American-born classification theorist.

Born in Lincoln, Nebraska, she studied English at the University of Chicago and American civilization at Brown University. Beghtol began teaching at what became Concordia University in 1967, then became an editor and writer. Beghtol received a master's degree in library science from the University of Toronto in 1979. She joined the Canadian Broadcasting Corporation and continued working there while earning a doctoral degree. From 1987 to 1992, Beghtol was director of research at Ketchum Canada. She taught at the University of Toronto from 1991 to 2009. In 1999, Beghtol was editor of the journal Knowledge Organization. She died on 3 March 2018.

References

1942 births
2018 deaths
Library science scholars
Writers from Lincoln, Nebraska
University of Chicago alumni
Brown University alumni
University of Toronto alumni
Academic staff of the University of Toronto
Canadian Broadcasting Corporation people
American emigrants to Canada
Canadian book editors
Canadian publishers (people)
Academic journal editors